The 2014–15 Football League (known as the Sky Bet Football League for sponsorship reasons) was the 116th season of the Football League. It consisted of the usual 72 clubs, with the new additions being Luton Town and play-off winners Cambridge United, who returned to the Football League for the first time since 2005, replacing Bristol Rovers and Torquay United from League Two.

Promotion and relegation

From Premier League
 Relegated to Championship
 Norwich City
 Fulham
 Cardiff City

From Championship
 Promoted to Premier League
 Bournemouth
 Watford
 Norwich City

 Relegated to League One
 Millwall
 Wigan Athletic
 Blackpool

From League One
 Promoted to Championship
 Bristol City
 Milton Keynes Dons
 Preston North End

 Relegated to League One
 Notts County
 Crawley Town
 Leyton Orient
 Yeovil Town

From League Two
 Promoted to League One
 Burton Albion
 Shrewsbury Town
 Bury

 Relegated to Conference National
 Cheltenham Town
 Tranmere Rovers

From Conference National
 Promoted to League Two
 Barnet
 Bristol Rovers

Championship

Table

Play-offs

Results

League One

Table

Play-offs

Results

League Two

Table

Play-offs

Results

Managerial changes

References

External links
Football League website
BBC Sport

 
2014-15